Matulji is a municipality in Primorje-Gorski Kotar County, Croatia.

Municipality

There are a total of 11,246 inhabitants in the municipality, in the following 
settlements:

 Brdce, population 67
 Bregi, population 700
 Brešca, population 159
 Jurdani, population 651
 Jušići, population 861
 Kućeli, population 455
 Lipa, population 129
 Male Mune, population 103
 Mali Brgud, population 134
 Matulji, population 3,731
 Mihotići, population 1,050
 Mučići, population 362
 Pasjak, population 140
 Permani, population 102
 Rukavac, population 854
 Rupa, population 349
 Ružići, population 123
 Šapjane, population 188
 Vele Mune, population 122
 Veli Brgud, population 485
 Zaluki, population 73
 Zvoneće, population 279
 Žejane, population 130

In the 2011 census, 90.87% were Croats.

Transport

The municipality is of great transportation importance because of the major railway and highway networks connecting Rijeka with Ljubljana and Trieste to the west, Zagreb and Split to the east and Pula to the south through the Učka tunnel. Sixty five percent of the annual Croatian border traffic takes place through four international border crossings - Pasjak (with Starod in Ilirska Bistrica municipality on the Slovenian side), Rupa (with Jelšane), Mune (with Starod), and Lipa (with Novokračine) - within the Matulji municipality. Šapjane, a main railway crossing into Slovenia with Ilirska Bistrica) on the Slovenian side, is also in the municipality.

The Opatija - Matulji railway station, the principal railway station for Opatija and surrounding municipalities, was constructed and opened in 1873.

The A7 motorway starts in the northern part of the municipality, on the border crossing with Slovenia and connects with the A8 expressway at the south, next to Rijeka and Opatija.

Folklore

The region is well known locally for its Istro-Romanian folklore, namely Zvončari during the carnival festivities.

References

Sources
 Matulji Tourist Board

External links

Municipalities of Croatia
Populated places in Primorje-Gorski Kotar County